Paanch Phoron is a Bengali web series that is available on a regional OTT platform called Hoichoi as of February 14th 2019. The series is a collection of five romantic stories produced by five different directors. It is named after the panch phoron spice blend, which means 'five spices'. The series has been well received and is currently on its second season.

The series stars Jaya Ahsan, Anirban Bhattacharya, Siam Ahmed, Masuma Rahman Nabila, and Riddhi Sen.

Cast 
Anirban Bhattacharya
Jaya Ahsan
Derek Ngoni Moyo
Sohini Sarkar
Siam Ahmed
Masuma Rahman Nabila
Riddhi Sen
Vikram Chatterjee
Rajnandini Paul
Sohag Sen
Rawnak Hasan
Zakia Bari Momo
Krittika Chakraborty
Rohit Samanta
Debparna Chakraborty
Tariq Anam Khan
Yash Rohan
Orchita Sporshia
Amrita Chattopadhyay
Anindya Sengupta
Aindrila Sharma
Ritwika Pal
Anindya Pulak Banerjee
Biswajit Ghosh
Monir Khan Shimul
Ahmed Hasan Suny
Zinat Sanu Swagata
Farhana Mithu
Sudip Biswas Deep
Sneha Chatterjee Bhowmik
Missouri Rashid

Season 1 (2019)
Indian video streaming service Hoichoi released the five-episode first season on Valentine's Day in 2019 . 

The first episode, 'Phoringer Bou', is directed by Arka Ganguly. A young girl from a suburban city struggles to make friends due to her shy and quiet nature. The story begins with her newly made playmates marrying her to a dragonfly.

In the second episode, titled 'Gopone Prem Charan' and directed by Suman Mukhopadhyay, a young man falls in love with a married woman.

The third episode, titled 'Lilith', is directed by Dipankar Dipon. The story is set in the city of Dhaka, Bangladesh, where a fictional new technology, "the national truth rating", has taken the country by storm.

The fourth episode, 'Biroho Uttor', is directed by Bangladeshi director Tauquir Ahmed. In this story, a man struggles to keep his job. 

The final episode of the season, titled 'Ekti Paati Premer Golpo', and directed by Abhishek Saha, portrays the love of two childhood friends, now adults.

Episodes

Season 2 (2020)
Hoichoi launched the second season on 14 February 2020. This season stars Swastika Mukherjee, Sohini Sarkar, Saurav Chakraborty, and more. This season, like the first, presents five individual stories of love, each directed by different directors.

Episodes

Reception

Critical response 
Bhaskar Chattopadhyay, writing in Firstpost, rated the series three out of five stars saying "Paanch Phoron offers a satisfying and palatable fare by the end of it all, leaving you asking for a second helping".

Antara Chakraborthy of Indian Express writes "The first episode (my favourite) of Season 1 is a beautiful take on innocent love that happens in life before you even understand what love is. The episode takes its own time, but it never bothers us. The slow pace shows us exactly how laidback life is in a small town. The music, picturization and the director’s eye for detail make the episode a very memorable one."

References

External links

Indian web series
2017 web series debuts
Bengali-language web series
Hoichoi original programming